Disterna tasmaniensis is a species of beetle in the family Cerambycidae. It was described by Stephan von Breuning in 1982. It is known from Tasmania.

References

Zygocerini
Beetles described in 1982